Shekar Ali Kandi (also Romanized as Shekar ‘Alī Kandī; also known as Shekar ‘Alī Qeshlāqī) is a village in Peyghan Chayi Rural District, in the Central District of Kaleybar County, East Azerbaijan Province, Iran. At the 2006 census, its population was 99, in 20 families.

References 

Populated places in Kaleybar County